William Dustin (30 August 1909 – 24 September 2001) was a New Zealand cricketer. He played in eleven first-class matches for Wellington from 1927 to 1944.

See also
 List of Wellington representative cricketers

References

External links
 

1909 births
2001 deaths
New Zealand cricketers
Wellington cricketers
Cricketers from Palmerston North
Royal New Zealand Air Force cricketers